Lake Como Outlet is a river located in Cayuga County, New York. It drains Lake Como and flows into Fall Creek by Como, New York.

Rivers of Cayuga County, New York
Rivers of New York (state)